Beaver Branch is a  tributary to Blackbird Creek in southern New Castle County, Delaware in the United States.

Course

Beaver Branch rises just east of Pine Tree Corners in southern New Castle County, Delaware and flows southeast to meet Blackbird Creek northeast of Blackbird Landing.

Watershed

The Beaver Branch watershed is about 13% forested and 63% agricultural with the rest being other land uses.  The watershed receives approximately 43.2 in/year of precipitation and has a topographic wetness index of 562.53.

See also
List of Delaware rivers

Maps

References

External links
Delaware Watersheds: Blackbird Creek
Blackbird-Millington Corridor Conservation Area Plan

Rivers of Delaware
Rivers of New Castle County, Delaware
Tributaries of Delaware Bay